5,7-Dichlorokynurenic acid (DCKA) is a selective NMDA receptor antagonist acting at the glycine site of the NMDA receptor complex.

See also
 7-Chlorokynurenic acid
 Kynurenic acid

References

Enoic acids
NMDA receptor antagonists
Chloroarenes
4-Quinolones